Kontra Daya (Against Fraud) is an election watchdog based in the Philippines. The organization counts teachers, members of the clergy, information technology experts, and activists among its members. Member organizations include scientists' organization AGHAM, Alliance of Concerned Teachers, Blogwatch.ph, Computer Professionals Union, Health Action for Human Rights, Health Alliance for Democracy, Kawani Kontra Daya, and Promotion of Church Peoples Response.

The organization, patterned after international poll watchers' groups, aims to expose cheating and other forms of electoral fraud.

The late activist priest Joe Dizon served as one its convenors.

See also 

 Parish Pastoral Council for Responsible Voting
 National Movement for Free Elections

References 

Election and voting-related organizations
Elections in the Philippines
Corruption in the Philippines
Non-profit organizations based in the Philippines